The Edwardsville Formation is a geological structure in the Borden Group, of the Lower Mississippian sub system, (Osagean, late Tournaisian). Crinoids fossils can be found in the formation.

References

Geology of Indiana